Decies-within-Drum is a barony in County Waterford, Republic of Ireland.

Etymology
Decies (Déisi Muman) bounded in by the Drum Hills (Drom Fhinín).

Geography
Decies-within-Drum is located in the southwest of County Waterford, east of the Munster Blackwater and including the coast between Youghal and Dungarvan harbours.

History
Déisi Muman were an ancient Gaelic Irish tribe that occupied this territory; their name means "Vassals of Mumu." and they are believed by some historians to have Gaulish origin.

Decies-within-Drum was anciently the territory of the Ó Broic, a surname literally meaning "descendant of badger", perhaps a totemic animal. They claimed descent from the Fir Bolg.

The Ó Broic were later driven out by the Eóganachta of Desmond. After the Munster Plantation it came to the La Poer (Power) family. The Walsh/Welsh family were also largeg landowners.

The origin Decies barony was divided into two halves some time between 1654 and 1774. Decies-within-Drum contains Gaeltacht na nDéise, an Irish-speaking region.

List of settlements
Below is a list of settlements in Decies-within-Drum barony:

Aglish
Ardmore
Clashmore
Ring
Villierstown

References

Baronies of County Waterford